Vettilappara  is a village in Malappuram district in the state of Kerala, India.

Demographics
 India census, Vettilappara had a population of 8590 with 4306 males and 4284 females.
Village             = Vettilappara
Panchayath          = Urangattiri
Block Panchayath    = Areekode
District Panchayath = Malappuram

Transportation
Vettiappara village connects to other parts of India through Feroke town on the west and Nilambur town on the east.  National highway No. 66 passes through Pulikkal and the northern stretch connects to Goa and Mumbai.  The southern stretch connects to Cochin and Trivandrum.  State Highway No. 28 starts from Nilambur and connects to Ooty, Mysore and Bangalore through Highways 12, 29 and 181. The nearest airport is Kozhikode Airport.  The nearest major railway station is at Feroke.

Education
Govt High School, Vettilappara
Govt UP school, Odakkayam
Holy Cross Convent School, Vettilappara

Banks
Canara Bank Vettilappara
Vanitha Co-operative Bank Vettilappara

Nearest places
Areacode
KINARADAPPAN*
Nilabur
Thottumukkam
Kakkadampoyil
Edavanna

Tourist Attraction
Urakkuzhippara Waterfalls
Chekkunnu Mala
CHOTHUKADAVE DAM*
CHOTHUKADAVE BRIDGE*
Kollam Kolli Waterfalls
Odakkayam
Ruby Estate

River
Vettilappara Puzha (Cherupuzha)

This river originates from the Odakkayam hills. Many streams form Chekkunnu hills and Alappara hills flow into it.

Economy
Agriculture is the mainstay of economy. Major Crops are
Coconuts
Arecanut
Black Pepper
Rubber
Nutmeg
Plantain
Clove

References

Villages in Malappuram district
Kondotty area